Martin "Mike" Sennet Conner (August 31, 1891 – September 16, 1950), was an American politician,  lawyer, and college sports administrator who served as the governor of Mississippi from 1932 to 1936.

Biography
Martin Conner was born in Forrest County, Mississippi in August 1891 to Oscar Weir (1868-1923) and Holly Gertrude (née Sennett) Conner (1871-1937). In 1900 his family moved to rural Seminary in Covington County in southern Mississippi, where Conner likely obtained his high school education at the Seminary Attendance Center (now Seminary High School). Conner began his education at the University of Mississippi in Oxford at the age of 14 years, likely the youngest person to attend the university along with Enoch Starnes.

He continued his education at Yale University in New Haven, Connecticut, after which he began a legal career in Seminary and served as a member of the Mississippi House of Representatives from 1916 to 1924, including a stint as Speaker. His term as a governor corresponded with the Great Depression, but he maintained a state treasury surplus during his tenure. He was noted for going to the state penitentiary to preside over "mercy courts" that resulted in executive clemency for prisoners.  One of Conner's methods by which he orchestrated a positive $16 million swing in the state's finances (in only four years) was the introduction of a state sales tax.

Conner was allied with Huey Pierce Long, Jr., the governor of Louisiana from 1928 to 1932 and the U.S. senator from 1932 to 1935. Long struck up an alliance with Conner to support "good roads" connecting the neighboring states. From the sidelines, Long helped Conner win the Mississippi governorship though Conner had twice lost previous bid for the office. Conner's runoff election opponent and gubernatorial successor, Hugh L. White, tried to make an issue of Long's involvement in an out-of-state race.

Following his term as governor, Conner was the first commissioner of the Southeastern Conference (SEC) from August 21, 1940 through the fall of 1946.

Conner died in the capital city of Jackson and is interred there at Lakewood Memorial Park.

Trivia
The singer Elvis Presley was born in Tupelo, Mississippi on January 8, 1935, during Conner's term as governor.

References

External links 
 Martin Sennet Conner's grave at Find-A-Grave
 Profile at National Governors Association website

1891 births
1950 deaths
Methodists from Mississippi
Democratic Party governors of Mississippi
Speakers of the Mississippi House of Representatives
Democratic Party members of the Mississippi House of Representatives
People from Covington County, Mississippi
Southeastern Conference commissioners
University of Mississippi alumni
Yale University alumni
Mississippi lawyers
20th-century American politicians
Huey Long
Burials in Mississippi